Euro was one of eight s built for the  (Royal Italian Navy) during the 1920s. She was named after Euro, weak winter easterly wind bringing rain and storms to the Mediterranean.

Design and description
The Turbine-class destroyers were enlarged and improved versions of the preceding  s. Their complement was 12 officers and 167 enlisted men.

The Turbines were powered by two Parsons geared steam turbines, each driving one propeller shaft using steam supplied by three Thornycroft boilers.

Their main battery consisted of four  guns in two twin-gun turrets, one each fore and aft of the superstructure. Anti-aircraft (AA) defense for the Turbine-class ships was provided by a pair of  AA guns in single mounts amidships and a twin-gun mount for  machine guns. They were equipped with six  torpedo tubes in two triple mounts amidships. The Turbines could carry 52 mines.

Construction and career
Euro was laid down by Cantieri Navali del Tirreno at their Riva Trigoso shipyard on 24 January 1925, launched on 7 July 1927 and completed on 22 December.

Notes

Bibliography

External links
 Euro (1927) Marina Militare website

Turbine-class destroyers
World War II destroyers of Italy
1927 ships
Maritime incidents in September 1940
World War II shipwrecks in the Mediterranean Sea
Ships built in Italy
Maritime incidents in October 1943